Kathira Arachchige Dona Ama Kanchana (born 7 April 1991) is a Sri Lankan cricketer who plays for the Sri Lanka's women's cricket team. She made her One Day International (ODI) debut against South Africa on 15 October 2014.

Along with Eshani Kaushalya, she holds the record for the highest eighth-wicket partnership in a Women's Twenty20 International (WT20I), with 39 runs.

In October 2018, she was named in Sri Lanka's squad for the 2018 ICC Women's World Twenty20 tournament in the West Indies. In January 2020, she was named in Sri Lanka's squad for the 2020 ICC Women's T20 World Cup in Australia. In October 2021, she was named in Sri Lanka's team for the 2021 Women's Cricket World Cup Qualifier tournament in Zimbabwe. In January 2022, she was named in Sri Lanka's team for the 2022 Commonwealth Games Cricket Qualifier tournament in Malaysia. In July 2022, she was named in Sri Lanka's team for the cricket tournament at the 2022 Commonwealth Games in Birmingham, England.

References

External links
 

1991 births
Living people
People from Negombo
Sri Lankan women cricketers
Sri Lanka women One Day International cricketers
Sri Lanka women Twenty20 International cricketers
Cricketers at the 2022 Commonwealth Games
Commonwealth Games competitors for Sri Lanka